Benjamin Romain Roberts (born September 7, 1992) is an American football wide receiver for the Tennessee Titans who is currently a free agent. He played college football at Montana.

Professional career
Roberts was signed by the Titans as an undrafted free agent on May 16, 2016. On September 4, 2016, he was signed to the Titans' practice squad. Two days later, he was released from their practice squad.

References

External links
 Tennessee Titans bio
 Montana Grizzlies bio

1992 births
Living people
Sportspeople from Missoula, Montana
Players of American football from Montana
American football wide receivers
Montana Grizzlies football players
Tennessee Titans players